The 2015–16 CONCACAF Champions League (officially the 2015–16 Scotiabank CONCACAF Champions League for sponsorship reasons) was the 8th edition of the CONCACAF Champions League under its current name, and overall the 51st edition of the premier football club competition organized by CONCACAF, the regional governing body of North America, Central America, and the Caribbean.

América were the defending champions, and won their second consecutive title, and seventh CONCACAF club title (including the CONCACAF Champions' Cup era), by beating fellow Mexican team Tigres UANL 4–1 on aggregate in the final. As the winner of the 2015–16 CONCACAF Champions League, they qualified as the CONCACAF representative at the 2016 FIFA Club World Cup in Japan, their third appearance in the FIFA Club World Cup.

Qualification

Clubs may be disqualified and replaced by a club from another association if the club does not have an available stadium that meets CONCACAF regulations for safety. If a club's own stadium fails to meet the set standards then it may find a suitable replacement stadium within its own country. However, if it is still determined that the club cannot provide the adequate facilities then it runs the risk of being replaced.

North America
Nine teams from the North American Football Union (NAFU) qualify to the Champions League. The allocation to the three NAFU member associations is as follows: four berths for each of Mexico and the United States, and one berth for Canada.

For Mexico, the winners and runners-up of the Liga MX Apertura and Clausura tournaments earn berths in Pot 3 of the tournament's group stage. If a team reaches both tournament finals, the vacated berth is reallocated through regular season record.

For the United States, three berths are allocated through the Major League Soccer (MLS) regular season and playoffs; the fourth berth is allocated to the winner of its domestic cup competition, the Lamar Hunt U.S. Open Cup. If U.S.-based, the MLS Cup winner, the Supporters' Shield winner, the other regular season conference winner and the U.S. Open Cup winner are placed in Pot 3. If a team qualifies through multiple berths, or if any of the MLS berths are taken by a Canada-based MLS team, the berth is reallocated to the best U.S.-based team in the Supporters' Shield table which has failed to otherwise qualify.

Because Canada hosted the 2015 FIFA Women's World Cup, the 2015 Canadian Championship, typically played April–May, was extended, with the finals in August. Because a winner therefore would not be determined before the start of the 2015–16 CONCACAF Champions League, for this season only, the lone Canadian berth into the tournament (in Pot 1) was given to the best Canadian team in the MLS regular season. The champions of the 2015 Canadian Championship would instead qualify for the 2016–17 CONCACAF Champions League, and the Canadian Championship schedule in future years will finish in June or July, after the CONCACAF Champions League draw each year, so future winners of the Voyageurs Cup (the Canadian Championship trophy) will earn entry into the Champions League for the following calendar year instead of the same calendar year as in previous tournaments.

Central America
Twelve teams from the Central American Football Union (UNCAF) qualify to the Champions League. The allocation to the seven UNCAF member associations is as follows: two berths for each of Costa Rica, Honduras, Guatemala, Panama and El Salvador, and one berth for each of Nicaragua and Belize. The teams from Costa Rica, Honduras, Guatemala, and Panama are placed in Pot 2 and the teams from El Salvador, Nicaragua, and Belize are placed in Pot 1.

All of these leagues employ the split season with two tournaments in one year, so both tournament champions qualify if there are two available berths (if the same team wins both tournaments, the runner-up with the better aggregate record also qualifies), or the champion with the better aggregate record qualifies if there is only one available berth.

If one or more clubs is precluded, it is supplanted by a club from another Central American association. The reallocation is based on results from previous Champions League tournaments.

Caribbean
Three teams from the Caribbean Football Union (CFU) qualify to the Champions League. The three berths, in Pot 1, are allocated to the top three finishers of the CFU Club Championship, a subcontinental tournament open to clubs from the 31 CFU member associations. In order for a team to qualify for the CFU Club Championship, they usually need to finish as the champion or runner-up of their respective association's league in the previous season, but professional teams may also be selected by their associations if they play in the league of another country.

If any Caribbean club is precluded, it is supplanted by the fourth-place finisher from the CFU Club Championship.

Teams
The following 24 teams (from 12 associations) qualified for the tournament.

In the following table, the number of appearances, last appearance, and previous best result count only those in the CONCACAF Champions League era starting from 2008–09 (not counting those in the era of the Champions' Cup from 1962 to 2008).

Notes

Draw

Schedule
The schedule of the competition was as follows.

Group stage

Group A

Group B

Group C

Group D

Group E

Group F

Group G

Group H

Knockout stage

Seeding

Bracket

Quarterfinals

Semifinals

Final

Top goalscorers

Awards

See also
2016 FIFA Club World Cup

References

External links
CONCACAF Champions League , CONCACAF.com

 
1
CONCACAF Champions League seasons